Ladigesocypris irideus or Squalius irideus is a species of freshwater fish in the family Cyprinidae. It is known from three sites in Turkey, but remains poorly known, also as regards its taxonomy.

Some include it in the ghizáni (Squalius ghigii), else known from Rhodes only, although its closes relative appears to be Ladigesocypris mermere.

Sources

Ladigesocypris
Fish described in 1960
Taxonomy articles created by Polbot